was a Japanese aircraft manufacturer which produced several designs for the Imperial Japanese Navy. After the war, the company was reorganized as Aichi Machine Industry Co., Ltd (愛知機械工業) where they made small kei cars until 1966 when they were integrated into Nissan and developed the Nissan Sunny and Nissan Vanette.

Aichi Watch and Electric Manufacturing

The company was established in 1898 in Nagoya as Aichi Tokei Denki Seizo Kabushiki Kaisha (Aichi Watch and Electric Manufacturing Co., Ltd.). Aircraft production started in 1920, and the company relied initially on technical assistance from Heinkel, which influenced some of their designs. Later, with the prodding and support of the Imperial Japanese Navy, the company started making seaplanes using technology imported from Short Brothers in the UK.

During the inter-war period, Aichi was the beneficiary of technology transferred from Heinkel Flugzeugwerke of Germany. At the time, a team from the League of Nations occasionally visited German aircraft manufacturers to monitor the ban on military aircraft research and production. A Japanese military attache who was a member of the monitoring team, let Heinkel know, confidentially and in advance, of the planned visits. Heinkel thus succeeded in continuing its design on the aircraft ordered by Aichi Aircraft without being spotted.

In 1943 the aircraft division was spun off as Aichi Kokuki Kabushiki Kaisha (Aichi Aircraft Co., Ltd.).

Aircraft

Company designations
AB - "Aichi Biplane"
AB-1 - 1929 four-seat biplane/floatplane airliner
AB-2 - 1930 reconnaissance floatplane prototype
AB-3 - 1932 carrier-based reconnaissance floatplane based on the AB-2
AB-4 - 1932 night reconnaissance flying boat
AB-5 - Japanese-built version of the Heinkel He 62
AB-6 - 1933 reconnaissance floatplane prototype, lost to the Kawanishi E7K
AB-7 - company designation for the E8A
AB-8 - 1932 carrier-based attack bomber prototype, lost to the Kugisho B3Y
AB-9 - company designation for the D1A
AB-10
AB-11 - version of D1A with retractable landing gear, not built
AB-12 - company designation for the E10A
AB-13 - company designation for the F1A 
AB-14 - company designation for the E11A

AM - "Aichi Monoplane"
AM-7 -  planned monoplane version of E8A
AM-10 - planned monoplane version of F1A
AM-15 - light sport plane (project only)
AM-16 - planned night reconnaissance flying boat; design resembled the Grumman G-21
AM-17 - company designation for the D3A
AM-18 - company designation for the E12A
AM-19 - company designation for the E13A
AM-20 - company designation for the C4A
AM-21 - company designation for the H9A
AM-22 - company designation for the E16A
AM-23 - company designation for the B7A
AM-24 - company designation for the M6A
AM-25 - company designation for the S1A
AM-26 - company designation for the B8A

Fighter
Type H Carrier Fighter - 1926 carrier-based floatplane fighter; license-built Heinkel HD 23

Torpedo bomber
B7A 流星 Ryūsei (Shooting Star) - 'Grace' 1941 torpedo/dive bomber
B8A Mokusei (Wooden Star) - torpedo bomber (project only)

Dive bomber
D1A/D2A - 'Susie' 1934 dive bomber, based on the Heinkel He 66 
D3A - 'Val' 1940 carrier-based dive bomber

Reconnaissance aircraft
Type 15-Ko Reconnaissance Seaplane - 1925 prototype reconnaissance seaplane, lost to the Nakajima E2N
Type 2 Two-seat Reconnaissance Seaplane -  1928 reconnaissance floatplane; modified Heinkel HD 25
Type 2 Single-seat Reconnaissance Seaplane - 1928 reconnaissance floatplane; Japanese-built Heinkel HD 26
C4A - carrier-based high-speed reconnaissance aircraft (project only)
E3A - 1929 reconnaissance floatplane, improved Heinkel HD 56
E8A - 1933 reconnaissance floatplane prototype, lost to the Nakajima E8N
E10A - 'Hank' 1936 reconnaissance biplane flying boat
E11A - 'Laura' 1937 maritime patrol biplane flying boat
E12A - 1937 reconnaissance floatplane prototype
E13A - 'Jake' 1941 reconnaissance floatplane
E16A 瑞雲 Zuiun (Auspicious Cloud) - 'Paul' 1942 reconnaissance floatplane
F1A - 1940 reconnaissance floatplane prototype, lost to the Mitsubishi F1M

Flying boat
H9A - 1940 flying boat trainer

Trainer
E13A1-K - floatplane trainer version of E13A
M6A1-K 南山 Nanzan (South Mountain) - 1945 prototype trainer version of M6A

Special purpose
M6A 晴嵐 Seiran (Clear Sky Storm) - 1945 submarine-launched dive/torpedo bomber

Night fighter
S1A 電光 Denko (Bolt of Light) - 1944 night fighter prototype
E13A1a-S/E13A1b-S - night-fighter versions of E13A

Engines
Aichi AC-1 - 1929 experimental nine-cylinder radial engine
Aichi Atsuta (アツタ or 熱田) - licensed copy of the Daimler-Benz DB 601A inverted V12
Aichi Ha-70 - two Atsuta engines coupled together

Aichi Machine Industry

After the war, the company was reorganized, manufacturing kei cars under the Cony brand name in Japan. Its current descendant, Aichi Kikai Kōgyō Kabushiki Kaisha (Aichi Machine Industry Co., Ltd.), is integrated with the Nissan corporate structure.

Automotive contributions

Nissan engines
Nissan A engine
HR15DE / HR16DE
CR12DE / CR14DE
QG13DE / QG15DE / QG16DE / QG18DE

Transmissions
FS6R31 - with synchronous control.
F30A / F50A / F70A
MFA60 / MFA80
W60A
FS5R30A
MRA70
GR6

Vehicles manufactured
 Nissan Cherry
 Nissan Sunny
 Nissan Vanette
 Nissan Serena (Largo)
 Cony Guppy, a two-seat microcar
 Cony 360 Wide, a cabover keitora/Microvan/minitruck
 , predecessor to Cony 360
 Cony 360 a passenger kei car

References
Notes

Bibliography

 Mikesh, Robert C. and Shorzoe Abe. Japanese Aircraft, 1910-1941. London: Putnam Aeronautical, 1990. .
 Odagiri, Hiroyuki. Technology and Industrial Development in Japan. Oxford, UK: Clarendon Press, 1996. .

External links

 

Defunct aircraft manufacturers of Japan
Nissan
Manufacturing companies based in Nagoya
Defunct aircraft engine manufacturers of Japan